Ólafur Ólafsson may refer to:

Ólafur Ólafsson, Icelandic basketball player
Ólafur Darri Ólafsson, Icelandic actor, producer, and screenwriter
Ólafur Jóhann Ólafsson, Icelandic businessman, writer, and scientist
Olav Olavsen, born Ólafur Ólafsson, a naturalized Norwegian jurist and architect